Mark D. Sacks (29 December 1953 – 17 June 2008) was a British philosopher best known for his work on Kant, Post-Kantian idealism, and the epistemological tradition in European Philosophy. He was one of the few philosophers in Britain who sought to integrate the Analytic philosophy tradition with Continental philosophy.

He founded the European Journal of Philosophy in 1993, which is now a leading venue for work on Continental philosophy. He was a professor of philosophy at the University of Essex until his death.

His first degree was in philosophy, at Hebrew University of Jerusalem. He obtained a doctorate in philosophy from King's College, Cambridge under the supervision of Bernard Williams.

He died from prostate cancer at the age of 54.

Work 
 Objectivity and Insight (2003)
 The World We Found (1989)

External links 
 Personal home page with bibliography [Archived by Wayback Machine]
 Obituary from The Guardian
Obituary from [Archived by Wayback Machine]

1953 births
20th-century British philosophers
21st-century British philosophers
Academics of the University of Essex
Alumni of King's College, Cambridge
Deaths from prostate cancer
Hebrew University of Jerusalem alumni
2008 deaths
Epistemologists